Clock Without Hands is Nanci Griffith's fourteenth studio album, released in July 2001. This was her last studio album that Griffith worked with Elektra Records. It was named after Carson McCullers's final novel. The album contains a particularly personal collection of songs, including "Last Song for Mother", a tribute to her late mother. Vietnam is a recurring subject in several songs, including the biographical "Pearls Eye View (The Life of Dickey Chapelle)" for Dickey Chapelle, and "Traveling Through This Part of You" for her ex-husband, Eric Taylor, a Vietnam veteran.

Track listing
All tracks composed by Nanci Griffith except where indicated.
"Clock Without Hands" 3:43   
"Traveling Through This Part of You" 4:03   
"Where Would I Be" (Paul Carrack) 4:28   
"Midnight in Missoula"  3:59    
"Lost Him in the Sun" (John Stewart) 2:52    
"The Ghost Inside of Me" (John Stewart) 3:04  
"Truly Something Fine" (Griffith, James Hooker) 3:06    
"Cotton" (James Hooker) 2:41    
"Pearl's Eye View (The Life of Dickey Chapelle)" (Griffith, Maura Kennedy) 3:27  
"Roses on The 4th of July" 3:36    
"Shaking Out The Snow" (Griffith, James Hooker) 4:45    
"Armstrong" (John Stewart) 3:33    
"Last Song for Mother" 2:40    
"In The Wee Small Hours" (Bob Hilliard, David A. Mann) 2:50

Personnel
 Nanci Griffith - vocals, acoustic guitar
 David Davidson - violin
 Ray Kennedy - acoustic guitar, Moog synthesizer
 John Catchings - cello
 David Angell - violin
 John Stewart - acoustic guitar
 Monisa Angell - viola
 James Hooker - keyboards
 Pete Kennedy - electric, 12-string, mando and baritone guitars
 Jim Williamson - baritone saxophone, trumpet, flugelhorn
 Pat McInerney - drums, percussion
 Michael "Mike Dee" Johnson - vocals, classical guitar
 Doug Lancio - electric guitar
 Lee Satterfield - classical guitar, backing vocals
 Clive Gregson
 Maura Kennedy
 Jennifer Kimball - backing vocals
 Chas Williams - acoustic, electric and slide guitars, resonator guitar
 Le Ann Etheridge - backing vocals
 Ron De La Varga - cello, bass
 String Machine - strings

References

Nanci Griffith albums
2001 albums
Elektra Records albums